Topological Boolean algebra may refer to:

 In abstract algebra and mathematical logic, topological Boolean algebra is one of the many names that have been used for an interior algebra in the literature.
 In the work of the mathematician R.S. Pierce, a topological Boolean algebra is a Boolean algebra equipped with both a closure operator and a derivative operator generalizing T1 topological spaces and may be considered to be a special case of interior algebras rather than synonymous with them.
 In topological algebra — the study of topological spaces with algebraic structure, a topological Boolean algebra is a Boolean algebra endowed with a topological structure in which the operations of complement, join, and meet are continuous functions.